Sigillo is a comune (municipality) in the province of Perugia in the Italian region Umbria, located about 35 km northeast of Perugia.

Sigillo borders the following municipalities: Costacciaro, Fabriano, Fossato di Vico, Gubbio.

History
Before the Roman conquest, the territory of Sigillo was inhabited by the Suillates, an Umbri tribe; later it was a Roman municipality as Suillum and was a stage on the Via Flaminia. In 410 it was destroyed by the Goths of Alaric I during his march to Rome.

Later it was part of the Lombard Duchy of Spoleto and of the gastaldate of Nocera, which, after the Frank conquest in the late 8th century, became the county of Nocera. In 1230 Emperor Frederick II destroyed it to punish its Guelph stance. The commune of Perugia rebuilt Sigillo in 1274 with a large castle. Subsequently the center was disputed between the Baglioni, Boldrino, Azzo and Montefeltro families, as well as by the condottiero Braccio da Montone. In 1500 it was sacked by Cesare Borgia and, in the mid-16th century, became part of the Papal States.

Main sights

Romanesque-Gothic church of Santa Maria di Scirca, with 15th-century frescoes by Matteo di Gualdo
Church of St. Anne, on the ancient Via Flaminia.
Remains of the medieval Rocca ("Castle"), now an Augustinian convent.
Roman bridges

References

Cities and towns in Umbria